Don Moody (born March 16, 1962) is the executive producer and creator of several children's television shows  including WordWorld, a three-time Emmy Award winning  animated series that airs in over 90 countries, in 12 languages.

Early career
Moody began his career as a fine artist, then founded Moody Communications, a Manhattan-based advertising agency that serviced accounts in entertainment, internet technology, telecommunications, and fashion. Moody handled the branding, advertising, merchandising and licensing business for accounts such as Lucas Films, Disney, Mattel, Nine West and Sprint PCS.

Moody then entered the world of television production with the American Broadcasting Company, where he worked as an associate producer on the shows All My Children, One Life to Live, and Loving (TV series).

WordWorld

When Moody discovered his wife was pregnant, he created WordWorld, a multimedia property designed to capture children’s imaginations at a young age and foster a love of words and reading.

Under Moody's direction WordWorld has evolved into a three-time Emmy Award winning children's television show, licensed consumer products, and interactive mobile apps. The television series is broadcast in 12 languages and supports English Language Learning (ELL) around the world. A rigorous third-party study funded by the DOEd demonstrates WordWorld is an effective early literacy tool for preschoolers. WordWorld was the recipient of $20 million in grant funding by the US Department of Ed.

Mia & Codie

Moody also created Mia & Codie, a preschool comedy that introduces children to coding. In 2022, production started on the CG animated series with Canadian production company Epic Story Media. 

The series Mia & Codie has been commissioned by TVO, Knowledge Network and TFO.  The 40×4.5-minute show will be produced by Epic Story Media, with Relish Studios in Vancouver leading on animation.

References

1962 births
Living people
21st-century American politicians